King's Lynn Power Station is a combined cycle natural gas power station near King's Lynn in Norfolk, commissioned in 1997, and now owned by RWE. It was mothballed on 1 April 2012. It can generate 325 MW of electricity and employed 40 people. The site was reopened on 19 November 2019.

History
Construction of this power station began in October 1994 and was completed and started producing electricity in December 1997. The owners of the plant, TXU sold the plant to Centrica in October 2001.

The plant was mothballed on 1 April 2012 as older, less efficient, plants such as King's Lynn had become uneconomic due to high gas prices.

In December 2019 RWE purchased the plant from Centrica. The plant joins the UK gas portfolio which is the largest and most efficient fleet in the UK.

Description
The Combined cycle gas turbine power station is located on Willows Business Park, Saddlebow, King's Lynn and uses gas from National Grid's National Transmission System.

Original Specification
The station was built with one single shaft 237 MW Siemens V94.3 Gas driven Turbine with electrical generator running at 3,000 rpm. The terminal voltage is 21 kV. There is a vertical type triple pressure heat recovery steam generator designed by CMI SA (Belgium)and supplied by CMI SA and International Combustion (since 1997 known as ABB Combustion Services Ltd. The plant has one steam turbine that is coupled to the generator via a self synchronizing clutch. The plant was built with one air cooled condenser which compromises of 61 cooling modules of fins, tubes and fan arranged in four by four configuration, connected to the 132 kV electrical distribution system. The original output of the station was 325 MWe. The power station employs around forty-one staff.

Environmental performance
In 2006 it generated 900 GWh and emitted the following pollutants:-
Nitrogen oxides: 310,000 tonnes
Methane: 26,000 tonnes
Sulphur Dioxide <100,000 tonnes
Carbon Monoxide 13 tonnes
Carbon Dioxide 365,896 tonnes

King's Lynn B project
Centrica has an option to build about 1,000 MW of gas generation capacity near the present site, but has yet to decide if this will go ahead. In 2013 National Grid obtained consent to build a new 400 kV grid connection, but a decision on proceeding is awaited.

References

External links

Gas-fired power stations, Centrica Energy

Buildings and structures in Norfolk
Natural gas-fired power stations in England
Power stations in the East of England
King's Lynn